Catherine Suire (born 15 September 1959) is a French former tennis player who competed at the 1988 Summer Olympics in Seoul. She won eight doubles titles in her professional career, and reached her highest individual ranking on the WTA Tour on 14 May 1984, when she became the number 52 of the world.

Career finals

Singles (1 loss)

Doubles (8 wins, 8 losses)

ITF finals

Singles (0–3)

Doubles (4–2)

References

External links
 
 
 

1959 births
Living people
French female tennis players
Tennis players at the 1988 Summer Olympics
Olympic tennis players of France